Dane Strother is an American Democratic political strategist, media commentator, and former reporter who was part of the 1988 Pulitzer Prize-Winning staff at the Lawrence Eagle-Tribune. Strother was described in the New York Post and the Washington Examiner as a "legendary Democratic strategist."

As a subject matter expert, Strother has been featured in the Los Angeles Times, The New York Times, The New York Post, Washington Examiner, Roll Call, Campaigns and Elections, The Washington Post, and more.

Career
Strother has helped elect officials in multiple states and countries.  Strother has been the media strategist for U.S. Senator Mary Landrieu of Louisiana, Blanche Lincoln of Arkansas, Governor Roy Barnes of Georgia, Congressmen Lloyd Doggett and Henry Cuellar in Texas, and has led media efforts for Rock the Vote that the Washington Post described as "bold."

Strother sits on the board of visitors of the Louisiana State University Manship School of Mass Communications. Earlier in life, Strother was the editor of LSU's The Daily Reveille and sued the university over first amendment rights and won. Strother's father, Raymond Strother is credited with having "practically invented the political consulting business."

Personal life
Strother lives in Washington D.C., Sacramento, California, and Montana.

References 

Living people
Louisiana Democrats
Montana Democrats
American political consultants
Louisiana State University alumni
Journalists from Louisiana
Year of birth missing (living people)